Rasul in Iran may refer to:
 Rasul-e Afghan
 Rasul-e Sarani